Karingal is a local area within the suburb of Frankston located in Melbourne, Victoria in Australia. It is in the local government area of the City of Frankston (app. 45 km South East from the Melbourne CBD)

History
European settlement of the area now known as Karingal is recorded as far back as the 1840s.  Agricultural and pastoral land use continued in the area into the 1960s, when residential development spread from Frankston East into this locality.  As this part of Frankston was subdivided and developed (largely as an AV Jennings housing estate), it was dubbed "Karingal", a Koori word which translates as "happy home" or "happy camp".  During this time, the Karingal Post Office opened on 1 April 1964.

Ballam Park homestead
The "Ballam Ballam" estate was home to prominent early settlers of the Frankston area, the Liardets. Frank Liardet, son of early hotelier and artist Wilbraham Liardet, established the property in 1854. In the 1910s, responding to the suggestion that Frankston was named after Frank Liardet, Wilbraham's grandson stated that the family believed it had been named after the early white settler Charles Franks. The original homestead "Ballam Park" still stands in Karingal today, and is now heritage-listed. It is also home to the Frankston Historical Society, which conducts regular guided tours of the homestead.

Schools
Primary
Ballam Park Primary School
Karingal Heights Primary School
Karingal Primary School

Secondary
 McClelland College
 Naranga school for special education

Shopping
Karingal's original shopping centre, now known as Karingal Village Shops, is still located on Ashleigh Avenue, near Karingal Drive.  A large section of the earlier shopping centre was redeveloped at the turn of the century, replacing the old supermarket with a larger one, and the local service station with a bottle shop.  Karingal Post Office continues to operate, but in a part of the new complex.

Karingal is also home to Frankston's second largest shopping complex, Centro Karingal, or locally known as the 'Karingal Hub' or 'The Hub' (the largest being the Bayside Shopping Centre in the Frankston CBD). It features two Woolworths supermarkets, a Big W department store and 120 speciality stores. The centre boasts an entertainment precinct, called 'StarZone Karingal', with restaurants, a pub and a 12 screen Village Cinema complex. StarZone Karingal is also home to one of the three V max "super screens" in Australia.

Infrastructure

Transport
Karingal's arterial road is Karingal Drive, which runs through the heart of the suburb, from Skye Road to Cranbourne Road.  Ashleigh Avenue is another key road, which runs from Karingal Drive into Frankston East.  On Karingal's northern border, Skye Road is the connection with Frankston North, Seaford and Langwarrin.  Cranbourne Road touches Karingal's southernmost edge, and connects it to the Frankston CBD, to the neighbouring suburb of Langwarrin and terminates in the City of Casey suburb of Cranbourne. Metropolitan bus services run along all of these roads, connecting Karingal with the Frankston CBD and its neighbouring suburbs.

Another major transport route, Peninsula Link (also known as the Frankston By-Pass) opened in January 2013.  This divides Karingal and Langwarrin, and provides access to the rest of Greater Melbourne, and to the Mornington Peninsula.

Health
Two hospitals are located in Karingal, Peninsula Private Hospital and the St. John of God Rehabilitation Hospital.

Sport
Karingal Football Club, known as the "Karingal Bulls" is an Australian Football team competing in the 2nd division of the Mornington Peninsula Nepean Football League. Their home ground is located in Ballam Park alongside the Karingal Cricket Club. Ballam Park also have soccer and rugby fields, and an athletics track where Little Athletics and other events are held. Recent developments have been made to the main sporting precincts in Ballam Park.

See also
 Frankston, Victoria – the suburb of which Karingal is a locality.
 City of Frankston – the local government area of which Karingal is a part.
 List of people from Frankston – notable people from the City of Frankston (including Karingal).

References 

Frankston, Victoria